Alvin Todd (23 January 1903 – 27 June 1964), was an American film editor. He edited 62 films between 1929 and 1946.

He was born in Pennsylvania, United States and died in Los Angeles, California.

External links

1903 births
1964 deaths
American film editors